Sevan Nişanyan (born 21 December 1956) is a Turkish-Armenian writer and lexicographer. An author of a number of books ("The Wrong Republic", "The Etymological Dictionary" and others), Nişanyan was awarded the Ayşe Nur Zarakolu Liberty Award of the Turkish Human Rights Association in 2004 for his contributions to greater freedom of speech.

He is also known for his work to restore a semi-derelict village, Şirince, near Turkey’s Aegean coast.

Sevan Nişanyan was given a cumulative prison sentence of 16 years and 7 months for alleged building infractions, after he criticized the government’s attempts to prohibit the prophet Muhammad's criticism in a blog entry in September 2012. He escaped from the prison in July 2017 and moved to Athens, where he intended to apply for political asylum, as stated in his interview to the Belgian daily La Libre Belgique. He subsequently went to live in exile in Samos, stating that he is "grateful to the providence that the goatfuckers who run Turkey gave him, unintentionally, this splendid opportunity." In October 2021, while visiting Albania, he was reportedly declared persona non grata by the Greek authorities and banned from re-entry, with reason said to be a state secret.  His undesirability, according to Athens Voice, was the information passed to the police by local Samos agents as if "the Turk is buying real estate", which, if it happened, would violate the law on non-purchase of real estate by foreigners in some border areas. On January 7, 2022, the Greek justice dismissed the case, prohibiting any deportation to Turkey. The Armenian Embassy in Greece said Nişanyan must leave Greece voluntarily within 15 days according to the court decision, adding that as he is a citizen of Armenia, "he can leave for Armenia if he wishes”.

Early years and education
Nişanyan was born in Istanbul in 1956 to an Armenian family. His father was architect Vagarş Nişanyan. After graduating from the Private Armenian School of Pangaltı, he attended Robert College, then studied philosophy at Yale University, concentrating on Kant, Hegel, and Thomas Aquinas. He did graduate studies in political science at Columbia University, where he worked under Giovanni Sartori, Zbigniew Brzezinski, Seweryn Bialer, and Douglas Chalmers. His unfinished PhD thesis concerned the competitive strategies of political parties in unstable South American regimes. During his university years Nişanyan became fluent in several languages, including Latin, Arabic and Classical Armenian.

Travel writings and publications
In 1985 Nişanyan returned to his native Turkey to complete his compulsory military service. He spent the next two decades as a professional travel writer and guidebook editor in both English and Turkish language media. With journalist Thomas Goltz, he published a series of guidebooks on Turkey's regions. He wrote the American Express Guides to Athens, Prague, and Vienna & Budapest.

In 1998, with his wife Müjde, he brought out the first annual edition of The Little Hotel Book, a guidebook in Turkish and English to Turkey’s small and characterful hotels. The guide was immensely successful, topping national bestseller lists for ten consecutive years, and developing into a cultural icon of the ‘00s. It ceased to publish after the couple's highly publicised divorce in 2008.

Nişanyan was awarded the Ayşe Nur Zarakolu Liberty Award of the Turkish Human Rights Association in 2004 for his contributions to greater freedom of speech.

Şirince

Nişanyan married Müjde Tönbekici in 1992. The couple settled in Şirince, a former Greek-majority village in the Aegean hills of Western Turkey which had been semi-derelict since the 1923 population exchange between Greece and Turkey. They were instrumental in having the village declared a national heritage site, and they undertook to renovate ruined historic houses using the original materials and building techniques of the village.

Several of the renovated village houses were eventually converted into a highly acclaimed "Hotel de Charme" by the name of the Nişanyan Houses.

After 2006 Nişanyan collaborated with Ali Nesin, son of the writer Aziz Nesin and prominent mathematician and philanthropist, in developing the Nesin Mathematics Village near Şirince. Constructed strictly along the lines of traditional Aegean rural architecture, the village offered summer courses in college-level and postgraduate mathematics. It attracted prominent lecturers from around the world, accommodating over 300 resident students by summer 2013.

Nişanyan also built Tiyatro Medresesi, a theater institute and actors’ retreat in the manner of mediaeval Muslim seminaries. The Nişanyan Memorial Library was completed in 2013. A philosophy school became operative on the grounds of Mathematics Village in 2014.

The Etymological Dictionary
Nişanyan's Sözlerin Soyağacı: Çağdaş Türkçenin Etimolojik Sözlüğü (Etymological Dictionary of Contemporary Turkish), published in 2002 was the first and so far the most significant reference work in its field. Popularly known as "The Nişanyan Dictionary", a revised and expanded fifth edition was published in 2008. The full contents of the dictionary are available online at Nisanyansozluk.com, with new material added on a continuous basis. The current version covers detailed etymological data on over 15.000 words, in most cases including text quotations of earliest attested instances. In addition to being an indispensable source for Turkish, the dictionary is now recognised as a valuable tool for Semitic and Iranian etymology as well, on account of the analysis of more than 5000 Arabic and Persian loanwords embedded in contemporary Turkish vocabulary.

The Wrong Republic
Nişanyan wrote The Wrong Republic, a critique of the founding myths of the Republic of Turkey, which was established in 1923. Written in 1994, the book circulated widely in photocopy until it could no longer be legally published in 2008 without fear of reprisals.

Index Anatolicus
In 2010 Nişanyan published an index of over 16,000 place-names across Anatolia which had been changed under the Turkification policies of the Turkish Republic. There had been no previously published comprehensive documentation of the thousands of traditional names, mostly derived from Greek, Armenian, Kurdish, Syriac, Arabic, Lazuri or other more obscure antecedents, which had been replaced by newly invented Turkish or Turkish-sounding names in the 20th century.

The Index Anatolicus project went online in 2011, and developed into an effort to document all the historic toponyms of Turkey. The current database includes over 56,000 mapped place-names and can be viewed online.

Other books
Nişanyan published three collections of his linguistic essays in Elifin Öküzü, Kelimebaz and Kelimebaz-2. The essays dealt with a wide variety of topics in Turkish cultural history, exploring the complex multi–ethnic roots of modern Turkish culture.

In Hocam, Allaha Peygambere Laf Etmek Caiz Midir (2010) Nişanyan dealt with the limits of free speech under Islam.
Aslanlı Yol, his autobiography, was published in 2012. A series of essays on the cultural and linguistic sources of Islam, was brought together in Ağır Kitap in 2014.

Rock Tomb

In 2012 Nişanyan unveiled his Rock Tomb, an Ionic order facade in the manner of ancient Lycian rock tombs, measuring eight by five metres, carved into a limestone cliff facing the Mathematics Village near Şirince. The carving was done using hand tools, and took three years to complete. Nişanyan drew up the design and contributed much of the labor.

Criminal prosecution
Nişanyan was handed a cumulative jail sentence of 16 years and 7 months for alleged building infractions after he criticized the government’s attempts to prohibit criticism of the prophet Muhammad, in a blog entry in September 2012. Imprisoned since 2 January 2014, he escaped prison on 14 July 2017, tweeting, "The bird has flown away. Wishing the same for the rest of the 80 million.".

Personal life
Nişanyan has been married four times, to Corinna-Barbara Francis (1981-1985), Müjde Tonbekici (1992-2008), and Aynur Deniz (2009-2011). He has five children from the latter two, Arsen (born 1993), İris (1996), Tavit (2000), Anahit (2010) and Mihran (2012). On 5 May 2019 he married Ira Tzourou on Samos. He is described as an "outspoken Atheist".

Controversies
Nişanyan has been constantly under criticism for his controversial comments and behaviour on various topics. The earlier of those critiques relate to his commentary on a sexual abuse case, hence he was criticized for justifying sexual abuse and bullying. 

He emptied a jar of his feces over his ex wife Müjde Tonbekici, which resulted in widespread reaction and disgust from the public, calls to cancel his column on Agos newspaper was rejected by newspaper management.

After the 2020 Elazığ earthquake, Nişanyan tweeted that "Elazığ is the most bigoted, ignorant, most paranoid, and sexually obsessed city of Turkey where material and spiritual rape culture prevails. The city is based on a seized property, and is a prison of denied identities".

Books
Ağır Kitap (Heavy Book) - (2014)
Aslanlı Yol (Lion Road) - (2012) 
Şirince Meydan Muharebelerinin Mufassal Tarihçesi (Detailed History of the Şirince Pitched Battles)  - (2011)
Hocam, Allaha Peygambere Laf Etmek Caiz Midir? (Teacher, is it permissible to insult God and the Prophet?) - (2010)
Adını Unutan Ülke (The Country That Forgot Its Name) -  (2010)
Kelimebaz 2  (Vocabularybase 2) - (2010)
Kelimebaz 1 (Vocabularybase 1) - (2009)
Yanlış Cumhuriyet/Atatürk ve Kemalizm Üzerine 51 Soru (51 Questions on False Republic/Ataturk and Kemalism) - (2008) 
Eastern Turkey, A Travelers Handbook (2006)
Elifin Öküzü ya da Sürprizler Kitabı (Elif's Ox or The Book of Surprises) - (2002) 
Sözlerin Soyağacı: Çağdaş Türkçenin Etimolojik Sözlüğü (Genealogy of Words: Etymological Dictionary of Contemporary Turkish) - (2002)
Black Sea, A Travelers’ Handbook (2000)
The Undiscovered Places of Turkey (2000)
The Little Hotel Book (1998/2008) 
American Express Guide: Prague, Mitchell Beazley (1993)
American Express Guide: Vienna and Budapest, Mitchell Beazley (1992)
American Express Guide: Athens and the Classical Sites, Mitchell Beazley (1991)
Travels Bugs Turkey (1992)
Karl Marx: Grundrisse, Ekonomi Politiğin Eleştirisi için Ön Çalışma (Karl Marx: Grundrisse, Preliminary Study for the Critique of Political Economy) - (1980) 
Ankara'nın Doğusundaki Türkiye (Turkey to the East of Ankara) - (2006) 
Herkesin Bilmediği Olağanüstü Yerler (Extraordinary Places Not Everyone Knows) - (2000) 
Mavi Kıyılarda Yeme İçme Sanatı (The Art of Eating and Drinking on the Blue Shores) - (1998) 
100 Güzel Kelime (100 Beatifiul Word) - (2016)
Halim ile Selim (Halim and Selim) - (2018)
İyimser Zamanlar (Optimistic Times) - (2018)

References

External links
Nişanyan Houses
Etymological dictionary
Toponymical index
Mathematics Village
Theatre Madrasa
Facebook page
Twitter page
Books
"Istanbul-Armenian Intellectual Taken to Closed Prison" - Armenpress news item, January 2016

1956 births
Living people
Writers from Istanbul
Robert College alumni
Yale University alumni
Columbia Graduate School of Arts and Sciences alumni
20th-century travel writers
Turkish travel writers
Turkish people of Armenian descent
Turkish atheists
Turkish escapees
Turkish exiles
Turkish expatriates in Greece